Carenum is a genus of beetles in the family Carabidae, containing the following species:

 Carenum acutipes Sloane, 1897
 Carenum adelaidae (Blackburn, 1888)
 Carenum affine W. J. Macleay, 1864
 Carenum amplicolle Sloane, 1897
 Carenum angustipenne W. J. Macleay, 1871
 Carenum anthracinum W. J. Macleay, 1864
 Carenum batesi Masters, 1885
 Carenum bellum Sloane, 1917
 Carenum blackburni Sloane, 1916
 Carenum bonellii Brullé, 1835
 Carenum brevicolle Sloane, 1894
 Carenum breviforme H. W. Bates, 1874
 Carenum brevipenne (W. J. Macleay, 1887)
 Carenum brisbanense Laporte, 1867
 Carenum browni Sloane, 1916
 Carenum carbonarium Laporte, 1867
 Carenum cavipenne (H. W. Bates, 1874)
 Carenum cognatum Sloane, 1895
 Carenum concinnum Sloane, 1905
 Carenum convexum Chaudoir, 1868
 Carenum coracinum W. J. Macleay, 1865
 Carenum cordipenne Sloane, 1897
 Carenum coruscum W. J. Macleay, 1864
 Carenum cupreomarginatum Blackburn, 1888
 Carenum cupripenne W. J. Macleay, 1863
 Carenum decorum Sloane, 1888
 Carenum devastator Laporte, 1867
 Carenum devisii W. J. Macleay, 1883
 Carenum digglesi (W. J. Macleay, 1869)
 Carenum dispar W. J. Macleay, 1869
 Carenum distinctum W. J. Macleay, 1864
 Carenum ducale Sloane, 1905
 Carenum elegans W. J. Macleay, 1864
 Carenum emarginatum Sloane, 1900
 Carenum episcopale (Laporte, 1867)
 Carenum eximium Sloane, 1916
 Carenum felix Sloane, 1888
 Carenum filiforme (Laporte, 1867)
 Carenum floridum Sloane, 1917
 Carenum formosum Sloane, 1907
 Carenum foveolatum (W. J. Macleay, 1888)
 Carenum frenchi (Sloane, 1894)
 Carenum froggatti Sloane, 1897
 Carenum fugitivum Blackburn, 1888
 Carenum fulgidum Sloane, 1917
 Carenum gratiosum (Sloane, 1897)
 Carenum habile Sloane, 1892
 Carenum habitans Sloane, 1890
 Carenum imitator Sloane, 1897
 Carenum inconspicuum Blackburn, 1888
 Carenum ineditum W. J. Macleay, 1869
 Carenum interiore Sloane, 1888
 Carenum interruptum W. J. Macleay, 1865
 Carenum iridescens Sloane, 1894
 Carenum janthinum W. J. Macleay, 1883
 Carenum kingii W. J. Macleay, 1869
 Carenum laevigatum W. J. Macleay, 1864
 Carenum laevipenne W. J. Macleay, 1863
 Carenum laterale W. J. Macleay, 1865
 Carenum leai Sloane, 1916
 Carenum lepidum Sloane, 1890
 Carenum levissimum (Sloane, 1900)
 Carenum lobatum Sloane, 1900
 Carenum longulum Sloane, 1916
 Carenum macleayi Blackburn, 1888
 Carenum magnificum (W. J. Macleay, 1887)
 Carenum marginatum (Boisduval, 1835)
 Carenum montanum Sloane, 1916
 Carenum morosum Sloane, 1907
 Carenum nickerli F. J. M. L. Ancey, 1880
 Carenum nitidipes Sloane, 1916
 Carenum obsoletum W. J. Macleay, 1888
 Carenum occidentale Sloane, 1897
 Carenum odewahnii Laporte, 1867
 Carenum opacicolle Sloane, 1897
 Carenum optimum Sloane, 1895
 Carenum ovalee Sloane, 1900
 Carenum parvulum W. J. Macleay, 1873
 Carenum perplexum A. White, 1841
 Carenum planipenne W. J. Macleay, 1873
 Carenum politissimum Chaudoir, 1868
 Carenum politum Westwood, 1842
 Carenum porphyreum H. W. Bates, 1874
 Carenum pulchrum Sloane, 1897
 Carenum puncticolle W. J. Macleay, 1864
 Carenum punctipenne (W. J. Macleay, 1883)
 Carenum purpuratum (Laporte, 1867)
 Carenum purpureum Sloane, 1897
 Carenum pusillum W. J. Macleay, 1883
 Carenum quadripunctatum W. J. Macleay, 1863
 Carenum rectangulare W. J. Macleay, 1864
 Carenum reflexum Sloane, 1897
 Carenum regulare Sloane, 1900
 Carenum rutilans Sloane, 1907
 Carenum scaritoides Westwood, 1843
 Carenum serratipes Sloane, 1900
 Carenum simile W. J. Macleay, 1865
 Carenum smaragdulum Westwood, 1842
 Carenum speciosum Sloane, 1888
 Carenum splendens Laporte, 1867
 Carenum splendidum W. J. Macleay, 1863
 Carenum striatopunctatum W. J. Macleay, 1865
 Carenum subcostatum W. J. Macleay, 1865
 Carenum subcyaneum W. J. Macleay, 1869
 Carenum submetallicum W. J. Macleay, 1871
 Carenum subplanatum H. W. Bates, 1874
 Carenum subporcatulum W. J. Macleay, 1865
 Carenum sumptuosum Westwood, 1842
 Carenum terraereginae W. J. Macleay, 1883
 Carenum tibiale Sloane, 1894
 Carenum tinctilatum (E. Newman, 1838)
 Carenum transversicolle Chaudoir, 1868
 Carenum tumidipes Sloane, 1900
 Carenum venustum Sloane, 1897
 Carenum versicolor Sloane, 1897
 Carenum violaceum W. J. Macleay, 1864
 Carenum virescens Sloane, 1894
 Carenum viridiaeneum (W. J. Macleay, 1888)
 Carenum viridicolor (Sloane, 1895)
 Carenum viridissimum (W. J. Macleay, 1888)

References

 
Carabidae genera